Lengehbiz (also Romanized as Lengehbīz) is a village in Arshaq-e Markazi Rural District, Arshaq District, Meshgin Shahr County, Ardabil Province, Iran. At the 2006 census, its population was 102, in 21 families.

References 

Towns and villages in Meshgin Shahr County